Kra Daadi is a district in Arunachal Pradesh in north-eastern India. It was carved out of Kurung Kumey district on 7 February 2015.

History
The creation of Kra Daadi district was approved on 21 March 2013 under the Arunachal Pradesh (Re-Organization of Districts) (Amendment) Bill.

Kra Daadi was inaugurated by the then Chief Minister Nabam Tuki as the 19th district of Arunachal Pradesh on 7 February 2015.

Administration
Palin is the headquarter of the district.  It has two assembly constituencies, viz., Tali, Palin, covering eight circles viz. clockwise from north, Pipsorang, Tali, Chambang, Palin, Yangte, Tarak Langdi, and Gangte. It is flanked by Tibet international border with China to the north, Upper Subansiri district to the east, Lower Subansiri district to the south, Papum Pare district to the southeast, Kurung Kumey district to the west. Pania is a sub-division in the district located few miles away from Palin and is administered by an Additional Deputy Commissioner.

Demographics 
The district has a population of 46,704. Scheduled Tribes are 46,123 (98.76%).

Nyishi is the predominant language, spoken by 98.43% of the population.

References

External links

 Official website

 
Districts of Arunachal Pradesh